Horatio Stanley Williams DSO (2 November 1886 – 30 April 1936) was a Welsh rugby union fullback who played club rugby for Newport. He won 4 caps for England and was selected for the British Lions 1910 tour of South Africa, in which he played in all three test games.

Rugby career
Williams first played for Newport in 1901 and was part of the team that faced the touring 1908 Australians. Whilst with Newport he had several trials with Wales and was at one stage selected as a reserve for the team, but was never officially selected to represent his birth country. In 1910 Williams was one of five Newport players chosen to represent the British Isles on their tour of South Africa. Williams played in all three test matches.

When the English rugby union invoked Newport's rugby union membership Williams switched his international allegiance to England. Williams was first capped for England on 21 January 1911 when he played against Wales at St Helens. England lost the match 11–15, but in the second game of the Championship Williams finished on the winning side when the English team crushed France 37–0. Williams played in the next two games for England when they lost in tight game to Ireland and beat Scotland to leave them with the Wooden Spoon.

International matches played
England
  1911
  1911
  1911
  1911

British Isles
  1910, 1910, 1910

Later life
Williams served his country during World War I, and was awarded the Distinguished Service Order for his actions during the conflict.

In 1936, on a return trip from Rio de Janeiro to Southampton on the Royal Mail ship Arlanza, Williams fell overboard and was declared lost.

His daughter, Christine Stanley Williams, who accompanied him on the trip on the Arlanza, married Sir David Peel Yates.

References

1886 births
1936 deaths
British & Irish Lions rugby union players from England
British & Irish Lions rugby union players from Wales
British Army personnel of World War I
Companions of the Distinguished Service Order
Deaths by drowning
England international rugby union players
Newport RFC players
Rugby union fullbacks
Rugby union players from Newport, Wales
Welsh rugby union players